Yldefonso may refer to:

Parque Yldefonso Solá Morales, multi-use stadium in Caguas, Puerto Rico
Teófilo Yldefonso (1903–1943), Filipino swimmer in the breaststroke